Humphrey Rudge Jr. (born 15 August 1977) is a Dutch former professional footballer who played as a defender.

Football career
He made his debut as part of the Roda JC squad in the 1996–97 season. As part of the team, he won two KNVB Cup finals, in 1996–97 and 1999–2000, respectively. He also played for Sparta, VVV, Apollon Limassol and Hibernian, before rejoining Roda JC and ending his career at RKC Waalwijk. Rudge retired from professional football in June 2009 due to recurring injuries in his knees.

With the Netherlands under-21 team, he participated in the 2000 UEFA European Under-21 Championship.

In September 2009, Rudge was appointed scout for English club Sunderland. In January 2013, he continued his career as a scout for PSV.

Personal life
His father Humphrey Rudge Sr. arrived in the Netherlands from Suriname in 1957 alongside teammates Puck Eliazer and Eddy Green to play football for Fortuna '54 in Geleen.

Honours
Roda JC
 KNVB Cup: 1996–97, 1999–2000
 Johan Cruyff Shield runner-up: 2000

References

Living people
1977 births
People from Geleen
Dutch footballers
Association football defenders
Netherlands youth international footballers
Netherlands under-21 international footballers
Roda JC Kerkrade players
Sparta Rotterdam players
VVV-Venlo players
Apollon Limassol FC players
Hibernian F.C. players
RKC Waalwijk players
Eredivisie players
Eerste Divisie players
Cypriot First Division players
Scottish Premier League players
Dutch expatriate footballers
Expatriate footballers in Cyprus
Expatriate footballers in Scotland
Dutch expatriate sportspeople in Cyprus
Dutch expatriate sportspeople in Scotland
Association football scouts
Sunderland A.F.C. non-playing staff
PSV Eindhoven non-playing staff
Footballers from Limburg (Netherlands)
Dutch expatriate sportspeople in England
Dutch sportspeople of Surinamese descent